Lysolecithin acyltransferase may refer to:
 1-acylglycerophosphocholine O-acyltransferase, an enzyme
 Phosphatidylcholine—sterol O-acyltransferase, an enzyme